Ettrick is the name of two places in the U.S. state of Wisconsin:

 Ettrick (town), Wisconsin
 Ettrick (village), Wisconsin, located within the town of the same name